This is a list of minicomics creators. People on this list should have Wikipedia articles.

Alphabetical list


A 
 Jessica Abel, Artbabe
Gary Arlington, publisher (San Francisco Comic Book Company)

B 
Ace Backwords
Jeffrey Brown

C 
Lilli Carre, Tales of Woodsman Pete, Swell

D 
 Julie Doucet, Dirty Plotte
 Michael Dowers, publisher (Starhead Comix)

E 
Phil Elliott, A7 Comics

F 
Matt Feazell, Cynicalman, et al.
Steve Fiorilla
Brad W. Foster, Jabberwocky Graphix
 R. Seth Friedman, publisher (Factsheet Five)

G 
Carl Gafford, Minotaur
 Clay Geerdes, publisher (Comix Wave)
Tim Goodyear, Video Tonfa
Vernon Grant
Richard "Grass" Green
Mike Gunderloy, publisher (Factsheet Five)

H 
Gary Hallgren
Kevin Huizenga, Supermonster

I

J

K

L 
Alec Longstreth, Phase 7
 Floyd Lewis, DARTGIRL
 Jeffrey Lewis

M 
Jim Main, PPFSZT! (Blue Plaque Publications)
Jason Marcy
Ted May, It Lives
Caesar Meadows, Mumbeaux Gumbo

N

O 
Douglas O'Neill

P 
John Porcellino, King Cat Comics & Stories

Q

R 
Ron Rege Jr.
Jesse Reklaw, Slow Wave
 Leonard Rifas, Quoz (1969)
Benjamin Rivers, Empty Words, Snow
Artie Edward Romero, Everyman Comics, Cascade Comix Monthly
Ed Romero, Realm

S 
Pete Silvia
Steve Skeates

T 
 Adrian Tomine, Optic Nerve
 Till Thomas, Zirp

U 
Colin Upton

V

W 
Larry Weir

X

Y

Z

See also
Amateur press association
Fandom
Fanzine
Minicomic Co-ops
Zine

References

Creators
Lists of comics creators